Clube Atlético de Luanda, best known as Atlético de Luanda, is a football club from Luanda, Angola. The club won its first title, the Girabola, in 1965.

See also
 2014 Girabola

References

Football clubs in Angola
Football clubs in Luanda
Sports clubs in Angola